Copperas Hill railway station served the small clifftop community of Copperas Hill, south of Harrington in the former county of Cumberland, England, which is now part of Cumbria.

A public passenger service called at the station between 2 June 1913 and September 1921, though unadvertised workmen's trains had started in April 1912 and continued until April 1929, after which all forms of passenger service ceased.

By 1922 the service had settled down to three trains each way between Lowca and Workington Central, though, surprisingly in that age, trains had stopped calling at Copperas Hill in September 1921. There never was a public Sunday service.

The station was on the Harrington and Lowca Light Railway which connected with the Cleator & Workington Junction Railway (CWJR) at Rosehill Junction a short distance north of Copperas Hill and south of Harrington Village. Public passenger trains ran to these last two only.

Freight services
The railway through Copperas Hill was first and foremost a mineral railway, with the short-lived workmen's and passenger services an afterthought. A waggonway had reached a chemical works at the station site in the first half of the nineteenth century, connecting Harrington harbour with John Pit and Hodgson Pit. Later developments, eventually ran northwards towards Workington and northeastwards to meet the Gilgarran Branch at Bain's Siding. The driving forces were coal at Lowca, fireclay and bricks (primarily aimed at lining furnaces at Workington's steelworks), coke and coking bi-products. Centrepiece for over fifty years was Harrington No. 10 Colliery which, confusingly, was not in Harrington, but in Lowca.

Between them these industrial concerns sustained the railway through Copperas Hill until final closure to all traffic in May 1973.

Although closed in 1921 the station was still in good shape in 1969.

A British record
Copperas Hill station was short-lived, but the track immediately north of the station has its place in the railway record books. Its southbound uphill gradient of 1 in 17 was the steepest adhesion-worked British incline carrying a regular, timetabled passenger service.

Afterlife
The track through the station site was lifted by the end of 1973. The trackbed now forms part of the Cumbrian Way.

See also
 Gilgarran Branch
 Cleator and Workington Junction Railway

References

Sources

Further reading

External links
 The closed station on an inter-war OS map National Library of Scotland
 The station Rail Map Online
 Latterday steam at Lowca flickr
 Latterday steam at Lowca flickr
 Industrial relics at Lowca flickr
 The line railwaycodes
 The Harrington collieries Haig Pit Mining Museum

Disused railway stations in Cumbria
Railway stations in Great Britain opened in 1913
Railway stations in Great Britain closed in 1921
1913 establishments in England